Major General Donald Clunes Butterworth  (3 February 18952 March 1983) was a senior British Army officer.

Military career
Butterworth was commissioned into the North Staffordshire Regiment on 23 February 1915 during the First World War.

As commanding officer of the 2nd Battalion the North Staffordshire Regiment, Butterworth was sent to France shortly after the outbreak of war in September 1939 as part of the British Expeditionary Force and was involved in the battles of France and Belgium before eventually being evacuated from Dunkirk on 1 June 1940. He was appointed a companion of the Distinguished Service Order in recognition of his role in this action. He went on to become commander of the 218th Brigade in the UK in October 1940, commander of the 113th Brigade in the UK in July 1941 and General Officer Commanding 38th (Welsh) Division also in the UK in April 1942.

After that he was deployed to Italy to become General Officer Commanding 78th Infantry Division in August 1944 and saw action fighting around the Gothic Line before handing over command in October 1944 and retiring in June 1948.

References

Bibliography

External links
Generals of World War II

|-

1895 births
1983 deaths
North Staffordshire Regiment officers
Companions of the Distinguished Service Order
British Army generals of World War II
British Army personnel of World War I
British Army major generals